Temiloluwa Elizabeth Otedola (born 20 March 1996) is a Nigerian actress and also a blogger. She is known for playing the role of Moremi Oluwa in the 2020 film Citation.

Early life and education 
Otedola (born 20 March 1996). She studied Art History at University College London, University of London.

Career 
Otedola started a fashion blog called JTO Fashion in December 2014. She documents fashion, beauty, art, and travel experiences. She made her Nollywood debut in 2020 in Citation by Kunle Afolayan. Her lead role in Citation, earned her an award at Ghana Movie Awards for Best Actress, ⁣ and was nominated for Revelation of the Year at Best of Nollywood Awards 2020. She returns to the big screen for her second feature since starring in Kunle Afolayan's "Citation" in Anthill studios' newest project "The Man For The Job", a feature film scripted and directed by Niyi Akinmolayan.

Personal life 

She is the last daughter of Nigerian billionaire, Femi Otedola and a younger sister to DJ Cuppy and Tolani. She is in a relationship with Nigerian singer, Mr Eazi with whom she has a podcast named How Far with Mr. Eazi and Temi. On 10 April 2022, she got engaged to Mr Eazi.

Filmography 
 Citation (2020) 
 The Man for the Job (2022)

Awards and nominations

References

External links 
  

Nigerian film actresses
1996 births
Living people
Alumni of the University of London
Otedola family
21st-century Nigerian actresses
Nigerian film award winners
Nigerian women bloggers
Yoruba actresses
Nigerian bloggers